is a railway station on the Hohi Main Line operated by JR Kyushu in Aso, Kumamoto, Japan.

Lines

Layout 
The station consists of an island platform serving two tracks at grade with a siding. The platform is accessed by a level crossing. The station building was a wooden structure of traditional Japanese design with a red tiled roof and housed a ticket window and a waiting room. This was damaged by earthquake in 2016 and has since been demolished.

Adjacent stations

History
The line was extended eastward in phases and Miyaji was established as the eastern terminal on 25 January 1918. On the same day, Akamizu was opened as an intermediate station on the new track. Through-traffic was established between Kumamoto and Ōita. The two lines were merged and the entire stretch redesignated as the Hōhi Main Line. With the privatization of Japanese National Railways (JNR), the successor of JGR, on 1 April 1987, Akamizu station came under the control of JR Kyushu.

JR Kyushu has commenced repair work, starting first with the sector from Higo-Ōzu to Tateno but has not announced a targeted completion date. The station building at Akamizu was heavily damaged. JR Kyushu declared that the structure was old and unsafe and had it demolished in November 2016.

Environs
Akamizu Post Office
Aso Akamizu Onsen
Aso Farm Land

See also
List of railway stations in Japan

References

External links
Akamizu (JR Kyushu)

Railway stations in Kumamoto Prefecture
Railway stations in Japan opened in 1918